"Flame" is a single and coronation song from the American Idol season 17 winner Laine Hardy. The song was written by Jon Levine and Ester Dean. Hardy performed the song after he was announced the winner in the finale. The song was released following his win on May 19, 2019.

Background
"Flame" was written by Jon Levine and Ester Dean, and it was chosen for him as the coronation song for the 17th season of American Idol.  The song however is written in the pop rock genre, and Hardy said that the song is not fully who he is since he is a country singer, but he was doing it to try something new to him.  He performed the song on the American Idol finale, later also performing in the Jimmy Kimmel Live!.  As the song is not in the country genre, it received only limited airplay on country stations.

Commercial performance
In its first full tracking week, the song sold 18,000 downloads in the US. "Flame" debuted and peaked at number 8 on the US Digital Songs chart.

Charts

References

External links

2019 debut singles
American Idol songs
Songs written by Ester Dean
Songs written by Jon Levine
2019 songs